Jaskółka may refer to:

Jaskółka-class minesweeper, of the Polish Navy
ORP Jaskółka, the lead ship of the Polish Navy class
SZD-8 Jaskółka, a Polish glider
SZD-14x Jaskółka M, a Polish glider
SZD-17X Jaskółka L, a Polish glider
Jaskółka (surname)

See also
Jaskólski